Cuvier Rempart is a bouldering area in the Fontainebleau forest, where its first 8a named C'etait Demain is located.

See also
 Fontainebleau rock climbing

External links
 at bleau.info

Geography of France